Helena Miagian Papilaya (born 16 April 1962) is an Indonesian former judoka. She competed in the women's middleweight event at the 1992 Summer Olympics.

References

External links
 

1962 births
Living people
Indonesian female judoka
Olympic judoka of Indonesia
Judoka at the 1992 Summer Olympics
Place of birth missing (living people)
20th-century Indonesian women
21st-century Indonesian women